Zhang Yu (born 19 April 2000) is a Chinese sports shooter.

References

2000 births
Living people
Chinese female sport shooters
Olympic shooters of China
Shooters at the 2020 Summer Olympics
21st-century Chinese women